The 2012 Wimbledon Men's Singles final was the championship tennis match of the Men's Singles tournament at the 2012 Wimbledon Championships. It pitted six-time champion Roger Federer and Andy Murray against each other in a Grand Slam final for the third time. After 3 hours and 24 minutes, Federer emerged victorious 4–6, 7–5, 6–3, 6–4.

The match saw Federer win a record seventeenth major title and a record-tying seventh Wimbledon championship. The victory also caused Federer to dethrone Novak Djokovic as World No. 1 and break Sampras' record of 286 weeks at the summit of men's tennis, having been one week short of the record when he lost the number one ranking in June 2010.
Murray became the first British man to reach the final of Wimbledon since 1938, and was seeking to be the first British Wimbledon champion since 1936.

Background 

Roger Federer entered the match as the all-time Grand Slam champion with a record of sixteen major titles, although he had not won any in the two and a half years since his victory at the 2010 Australian Open. Andy Murray had not yet won a single major title and was looking to avoid being the first male player since his coach Ivan Lendl to lose his first four finals.

The 2012 Wimbledon Men's Singles final was the third Grand Slam final that Federer and Murray had contested. Federer had won both previous finals, at the 2008 US Open and the 2010 Australian Open.

Since Federer's victory at the 2010 Australian Open, Rafael Nadal and Novak Djokovic had combined to win nine consecutive major tournaments, and had competed head-to-head in the last four consecutive finals. Nadal, however, had suffered a second round defeat to world no. 100 Lukas Rosol. Federer, on the other hand, had to battle through an epic five-set encounter in the third round against Frenchman Julien Benneteau where he survived 4–6, 6–7, 6–2, 7–6, 6–1. Federer would go on to beat the world no. 1 and defending champion Djokovic in the semifinals to reach the Wimbledon final for a record eighth appearance.

Match details 

The chair umpire was Enric Molina of Spain.

The players traded breaks early in the first set before Murray broke Federer in the ninth game and served out the set at 6–4. Murray had multiple chances to break throughout the beginning of the second set, but the six-time champion fought off all four break points. Federer broke Murray at 6-5 with a drop volley winner on set point. Rain stopped play early in the third set, and play was suspended for half an hour as the roof was closed for the first time for a Wimbledon final. The crucial moment came in the sixth game of the third set which lasted 20 minutes and saw ten deuces, with Federer finally converting the break on his sixth opportunity. Federer earned a break early in the fourth set and served the match out for his seventh Wimbledon Championship 4–6, 7–5, 6–3, 6–4.

Statistics 

Source

Significance 

The match enabled Federer to break three of the sport's most prestigious all-time records. He broke his own all-time record of Grand Slams, setting the new mark at seventeen. He also tied Pete Sampras for the most Wimbledon singles titles with seven.
Federer secured the world no. 1 position for the first time since June 2010 which enabled him to pass Sampras and set the record for most weeks at the summit of men's tennis. Federer went on to spend an additional 17 weeks at world no. 1 and set the record (since the 1973 inception of the ATP rankings) at 302 weeks. It was Federer's last major title for four and a half years, when he won his 18th grand slam at the 2017 Australian Open.

For Murray, it was his fourth grand slam final defeat without yet achieving a victory, emulating his coach Ivan Lendl. However, four weeks later Murray defeated Federer in three straight sets to win the Olympic men's singles gold for Great Britain, which also took place at Wimbledon on the very same centre court. Murray also won his first grand slam title that year at the US Open and his first Wimbledon title the following year.

This was the first final to be played under the new retractable roof that was originally installed in 2009.
The television ratings in the United Kingdom set a record with 16.9 million viewers, which was the highest Wimbledon final viewership since accurate statistics began in 1990. In the United States it scored the second largest ratings for a Wimbledon final in the last decade behind only 2009 when Federer beat American Andy Roddick 16-14 in the fifth set.

See also 

 Federer–Murray rivalry

References

External links 
 Match details at the ATP's official site
 Head to Head player details at the ATP's official site

2012
Andy Murray tennis matches
Roger Federer tennis matches
2012 Wimbledon Championships